Aliu Djaló (born 5 February 1992) is a  Bissau-Guinean footballer who plays as a midfielder for Icelandic side Hvöt. Beside Aliu Djaló, he is also widely known as Kaby Djaló, or even simply Kaby. He has represented the Guinea-Bissau national team but also has Portuguese citizenship.

Club career
Born in Bissau, Guinea-Bissau, he spent his early career in Portugal, playing in the youth teams of Boavista since 2003.  In 2007, he moved to England to join Premier League side Chelsea where he played in their youth team until 2011.  Afterwards, he was promoted to the Chelsea reserve squad in the first half of the 2011–12 season.

During the winter break of the 2011–12 season, he moved to Cyprus and made his debut as a senior while playing with AEL Limassol in the Cypriot First Division contributing for AEL's championship winning squad.

On 13 August 2012, Djaló arrived in Serbia and spent a period on trial at Red Star Belgrade.

In December 2012 Djaló spent a period on trial with League One side Yeovil Town but failed to earn a contract.

On 18 July 2013, Djaló signed with Marítimo.

On 31 August 2016, Djaló returned to England after spells in Romania, Poland and Finland to join League Two side Crawley Town on a two-year deal. On 17 September 2016, Djaló made his Crawley debut in a 2–0 home victory against Luton Town, featuring for the entire 90 minutes. On 15 October 2016, Djaló scored his first goal for Crawley in their 2–1 away defeat against Cheltenham Town, netting in the 78th minute. On 14 May 2019, it was announced that Djaló would leave Crawley at the end of his current deal in June.

In July 2019, Djaló joined Icelandic club Njarðvík and the following year he remained in the country to play for Víðir.

International career
Despite being born in Guinea-Bissau, Djaló has represented Portugal at U-17 and U-18 level. Djaló later joined the Guinea Bissau national football team and made his debut in a 2017 Africa Cup of Nations qualification 3–2 win over Zambia.

Career statistics

Honours

AEL Limasol
 Cypriot First Division winner: 2011–12
 Cypriot Cup runner-up: 2012

PS Kemi
 Ykkönen winner: 2015

References

External links
 
 

1992 births
Living people
Sportspeople from Bissau
Bissau-Guinean footballers
Guinea-Bissau international footballers
Bissau-Guinean emigrants to Portugal
Portuguese footballers
Portugal youth international footballers
Portuguese people of Bissau-Guinean descent
Association football midfielders
Cypriot First Division players
Liga I players
Boavista F.C. players
Chelsea F.C. players
AEL Limassol players
CS Gaz Metan Mediaș players
Crawley Town F.C. players
Portuguese expatriate footballers
Expatriate footballers in Cyprus
Expatriate footballers in Romania
Expatriate footballers in Poland
Expatriate footballers in Finland
Expatriate footballers in England
Expatriate footballers in Iceland
Bissau-Guinean expatriate sportspeople in Cyprus
Bissau-Guinean expatriate sportspeople in Romania
Bissau-Guinean expatriate sportspeople in Poland
Bissau-Guinean expatriate sportspeople in Finland
Bissau-Guinean expatriate sportspeople in England
Bissau-Guinean expatriate sportspeople in Iceland
MKP Pogoń Siedlce players
Njarðvík FC players
2. deild karla players
1. deild karla players
3. deild karla players